Crazy Love is the fifth studio album from Canadian Christian rock band Hawk Nelson. It was released on February 8, 2011. It is the last album with lead vocalist Jason Dunn, who left the band in 2012 to pursue a solo career.  The album netted a nomination for Best Contemporary Christian/Gospel Album at the Juno Awards of 2012.

Concept and musical style
At live shows in 2010, the band claimed that Crazy Love will be very fast, and much more of a throwback to their first album Letters to the President. Guitarist Jon Steingard claims on his blog that it's "the most high-energy Hawk Nelson record ever. I'd even cautiously say it's more high-energy than our first album, Letters to the President."

Track listing

The Light Sides

Packaged with Crazy Love is a second disc called "The Light Sides", which features 11 acoustic versions of Hawk Nelson favorites from the band's previous albums. "Stagefright" is not featured on any of Hawk Nelson's previous albums.

Charts

References

Hawk Nelson albums
2011 albums
BEC Recordings albums
Tooth & Nail Records albums